Paul O'Neill may refer to:

Sports
Paul O'Neill (baseball) (born 1963), former Major League Baseball player and current broadcaster
Paul O'Neill (cyclist), Australian Paralympian
Paul O'Neill (footballer) (born 1982), English footballer
Paul O'Neill (gymnast) (born 1965), American gymnast
Paul O'Neill (racing driver) (born 1979), racecar driver

Other people
Paul O'Neill (author) (1928–2013), Canadian historian, writer and producer
Paul O'Neill (newspaper editor), editor of The Irish Times
Paul O'Neill (producer) (1956–2017), American rock music producer, composer and guitarist
Paul H. O'Neill (1935–2020), American businessman and U.S. Secretary of the Treasury

See also
Paul O'Neal, Chicago police shooting victim
Paul O'Neil (born 1953), American ice hockey player